Hot Rod Charlie (foaled April 11, 2018) is an American Thoroughbred racehorse who won the 2021 Pennsylvania Derby and Louisiana Derby. He also came second in the 2020 Breeders' Cup Juvenile and 2021 Kentucky Derby and Belmont Stakes, and fourth in the 2021 Breeders' Cup Classic. He was voted the winner of the 2021 Secretariat Vox Populi Award.

Background
Hot Rod Charlie is a dark bay colt bred in Kentucky. Charlie is by Oxbow and out of Indian Miss who is a daughter of  Awesome Again. Oxbow is the 2013 Preakness Stakes winner, for whom Charlie is his leading performer to date. His half-brother is Eclipse winner Mitole. Both Hot Rod Charlie and Mitole were bred by the late Edward Cox Jr.

Trained by Doug O'Neill, he was purchased for $110,000 by Roadrunner Racing (50%), William Strauss (25%) and Boat Racing LLC (25%). In October 2019 at the same venue Hot Rod Charlie was purchased for $110,000 by Dennis O'Neill for Roadrunner Racing (50%), William Strauss (25%) and Boat Racing LLC (25%). Boat Racing LLC partners include five former members of the Brown University football team: Reiley Higgins, Patrick O'Neill, Alex Quoyeser, Eric Armagost, and Dan Giovacchini. They consider the horse their sixth member. Patrick O'Neil is a nephew of trainer Doug O'Neil and, as he was born into a Thoroughbred racing family, he acted as a guide for the other Boat Racing LLC partners as they debuted as horse owners in the sport.

Racing career

2020: Two-year-old season
Hot Rod Charlie started his career with a fourth, third, and fifth-place finish in three maiden special weight races at Del Mar Racetrack. In his second race, he finished behind future Grade One winner Get Her Number.

He finally broke his maiden in another Del Mar maiden special weight on October 2.

Hot Rod Charlie went straight to the Breeders' Cup Juvenile, where he nearly pulled a huge upset after coming second at odds of 94-1 behind the winner and 2020 Champion Two-Year-Old Essential Quality.

2021: Three-year-old season
Hot Rod Charlie made his first start as a three-year-old in the Robert B. Lewis Stakes at Santa Anita Park, where he came in third in a blanket finish won by future Kentucky Derby winner Medina Spirit.
 
On March 20, Hot Rod Charlie won the 2021 Louisiana Derby over Lecomte Stakes winner Midnight Bourbon and Risen Star Stakes winner Mandaloun. He broke the track record for the 1 & 3/16 mile course with a time of 1:55:06. He won by over two lengths and took home a purse of $1 million. This victory secured him a spot in the 2021 Kentucky Derby field.

Hot Rod Charlie ran a big race under jockey Flavien Prat to come in third in the Kentucky Derby behind Medina Spirit and Mandaloun, with Essential Quality fourth.

Hot Rod Charlie bypassed the 2021 Preakness Stakes, the second leg of Triple Crown,
 and he made his next start in the 2021 Belmont Stakes, the third leg of the Triple Crown. He was sent off at odds of 9–2, and was ridden by Flavien Prat. After setting the fastest early fractions in the history of the race, Hot Rod Charlie came an ultra-game second after a furious stretch battle with Essential Quality. It was another 11 lengths back for Preakness Stakes winner Rombauer in third.  In the Belmont Stakes he was ridden once again by jockey Flavien Prat who in the intermittency between the Kentucky Derby and the Belmont rode Rombauer to victory in the 2021 Preakness Stakes, a race in which Hot Rod Charlie did not compete. When Hot Rod Charlie was entered into the Belmont, Prat honored his prior commitment to ride him rather than to mount Rombauer who also ran the race.

On July 17 in the Haskell Stakes at Monmouth Park Racetrack in Oceanport, New Jersey, Hot Rod Charlie crossed the finish line first but was disqualified. He was moved to last place for impeding the path of Midnight Bourbon, whose jockey Paco Lopez was dislodged.  Subsequently, Mandaloun, who had crossed second in a photo finish, was declared the winner. The 2021 Haskell Stakes was the first major race in the United States where jockeys were unable to use a whip in anything but an emergency  situation as per a relatively new New Jersey state law. When asked if this affected the race's outcome and the accident, Charlie's jockey Flavien Prat said ..."Yes, the lack of a crop came into play. I was trying to correct him as much as I could. If I could have hit him just one time left-handed, we would have been just fine, but it is what it is..."

On September 25, in the Pennsylvania Derby, at Parx Racing, in Bensalem, Pennsylvania, Hot Rod Charlie crossed the finish line first, winning the $1 million Grade I race by  lengths in front of Midnight Bourbon. His time for this  mile race for 3-year-olds was 1:48.63. Again, his race was overshadowed by another inquiry and a rider's claim of foul and these again for the same horse, Midnight Bourbon as his last race, the Haskell Stakes. These went also went to the stewards to resolve. This time, however, the stewards did not see enough conclusive proof that would warrant disqualification, so the result stood, and the race order stayed in Charlie's favor. Hot Rod Charlie's trainer, Doug O'Neill, saw no foul, but Midnight Bourbon's trainer, Steve Ausmussen, clearly did not share his view, saying,""Flavien Prat almost drops Midnight Bourbon for the second time. My horse ran well. He survived,". Charlie's next step is the November 6, 2021, Breeders' Cup Classic (G1).

In December 2021 Hot Rod Charlie was named the winner of that year's "Secretariat Vox Populi Award" (created by Secretariat's owner Penny Chenery), which "recognizes the horse whose popularity and racing excellence best resounded with the American public and gained recognition for Thoroughbred racing"

On 26 December 2021 Hot Rod Charlie raced in the Grade II San Antonio Stakes and started as the 1/5 odds-on favorite. He was well placed in the
early going, off the rail or outside a rival, bid alongside the leader on the far turn, battled down the stretch while brushing with Eight Ring, taking a short lead in the straight and was caught at the finishing line.

2022: Four-year-old season

The connections of Hot Rod Charlie entered the horse for the Dubai World Cup. On 17 January the horse departed the U.S. to prepare for the event having his last workout at Santa Anita Park going five furlongs in 1:01. Hot Rod Charlie won the Group 2 Al Maktoum Challenge, Round 2 on February 4 as a final prep for the World Cup.

Hot Rod Charlie as expected started in the Dubai World Cup, held on March 26 at Meydan in the United Arab Emirates. Country Grammer crossed the wire  lengths in front of Hot Rod Charlie, who grabbed second for a United States exacta, while favorite Life Is Good finished in fourth place. Under an early drive down the backstretch, dropping back, but found another gear late with a charge along the inside. "We wanted to win but we're super proud of his effort," trainer Doug O'Neill said. Hot Rod Charlie earned US$2,000,000 for his second-place finish in one of the richest races in the world.

After a break of nearly three months, Hot Rod Charlie returned in the Grade III Salvator Mile at Monmouth Park. In a five horse field Hot Rod Charlie was made the 1/5 odds-on favorite but was upset by 2/1 Mind Control after hitting the front in the stretch run, beaten by a head. The final time was 1:35.79 on a fast track.

On August 6, Hot Rod Charlie was entered in the Grade I Whitney Stakes at Saratoga Race Course. A small field of five started including Life Is Good and Happy Saver. Hot Rod Charlie, the third choice at 4/1 started well and tracked inside around the first turn, settled in second position while along the rail on the backstretch, save round early on the far turn. Hot Rod Charlie was  lengths behind leader Life Is Good and was still two lengths behind after six furlongs in a quick 1:10.93. Happy Saver and Hot Rod Charlie took runs at Life Is Good in the early stretch but could not pass him with Hot Rod Charlie finishing third in a time 1:48.97.

On October 1, Hot Rod Charlie faced five other horses including Art Collector, Happy Saver and 2022 Kentucky Derby winner Rich Strike in the Grade II Lukas Classic Stakes. Starting as the 6/5 favorite Hot Rod Charlie settled on the outside of leader Art Collector. As the horses rounded the turn into the stretch Hot Rod Charlie took command but Rich Strike came four wide and took the lead at the sixteenth pole. However, with Tyler Gaffalione in the reins Hot Rod Charlie battled back gamely to win by a head in a time of 1:49.77. Gaffalione said after the race, "Doug (trainer O'Neill) and his team really had him ready to run today. We broke well and he doesn't really have to be asked to get into a good spot. He really never gave up on me. (Rich Strike) ran a huge effort and my horse just kept on fighting the entire way. He really didn't want to get beat."

Hot Rod Charlie finished sixth to Flightline in the 2022 Breeders' Cup Classic at Del Mar Racecourse.

Racing statistics 

Legend:

 
 

Notes:

An (*) asterisk after the odds means Hot Rod Charlie was the post-time favorite.

Source:

Pedigree

References

2018 racehorse births
Thoroughbred racehorses
Racehorses trained in the United States
Horse racing track record setters
Racehorses bred in Kentucky
Thoroughbred family 11-d
American Grade 1 Stakes winners